The Fernsehturm Heidelberg is a transmission tower for FM and DVB-T on the Königstuhl hill of Heidelberg at . It was the property of the City of Heidelberg and sold to the SWR. Because of its exposed location on the crest of the hill the tower itself is only 82 meters high.

The Heidelberg TV tower has an open-air observation deck 30 metres up its height, which can be reached by an elevator. The observation deck is now permanently closed for visitors due to safety concerns. The sale of the tower sealed the fate of the observation deck which used to enable tourist a spectacular 360 degrees view of the region.

In the first years of its existence the tower was also used as a water tower. The water tank is located within the main body behind the observation deck.

11 digital TV channels on 3 multiplexes are broadcast from the TV tower. DVB-T Frequencies are channel 21 (474 MHz) for the ZDF transponder, 49 (698 MHz) and 60 (698 MHz) for the ARD/SWR transponders. TV channels broadcast are ARD, ZDF, SWR, HR, WDR, BR, 3Sat, Doku/Kika, Phoenix, Arte and EinsPlus. Each Multiplex is broadcast with 50 kW, with plans to double that to 100 kW near or mid-term. On November 5, 2008, frequencies were changed for all 3 transponders. That transition canceled the SFN (Single-Frequency Network) with the Stuttgart region (New frequencies will be in place on Nov. 11th, 2008, due to a new TV master plan for Europe).

4 analog FM radio channels are broadcast from this tower. SWR1 97.8 MHz, SWR2 88.8 MHz, SWR3 99.9 MHz and SWR4 104.1 MHz. Also one digital radio multiplex (DAB) is broadcast from this tower on DAB channel 12A. Available channels on that digital channel are SWR 1 Baden–Württemberg, SWR 2, SWR 3, DASDING and SWR cont.ra.

The Telecom Telecommunication Tower Heidelberg and former Telecommunication Tower of US-Forces Heidelberg (returned to the state of Baden-Wuerttemberg) are located close by. Both are off limits to the public.

See also
 List of towers

External links

 
 http://www.skyscraperpage.com/diagrams/?b7805

Buildings and structures in Heidelberg
Communication towers in Germany
Water towers in Germany
Observation towers